The 2008–09 season was Coventry City's 89th season in The Football League and their 8th consecutive season in the Football League Championship. Along with competing in the Championship, the club also participated in the FA Cup and Football League Cup. The season covers the period from 1 July 2008 to 30 June 2009.

Review and events

Monthly events
This is a list of the significant events to occur at the club during the 2008-09 season, presented in chronological order. This list does not include transfers, which are listed in the transfers section below, or match results, which are in the results section.

June:
13 - Coventry City draw Aldershot Town at home in the League Cup First Round.
16 - Life President Mike McGinnity and former player Cyrille Regis receive MBEs in The Queen's birthday honours list.
16 - Coventry City's fixtures for the 2008/2009 Championship season are announced
23 - Coventry City announce the new squad numbers for the forthcoming season.

July:
4 - Coventry City travel to Switzerland for pre-season tour where they will face Romanian side FC Brașov and Swiss side Stade Nyonnais.

August:
4 - Scott Dann is named new club captain for the 2008-09 season, taking over from Michael Doyle.
5 - Coventry City announce new association with Coventry Sphinx.
11 - Keiren Westwood on his debut, is named in the Official Football League Championship team of the week, following his performance against Norwich City.
13 - Coventry City celebrate their 125th anniversary, they mark the event with a victory over Aldershot Town in the League Cup.
13 - Coventry City draw Newcastle United at home in the League Cup Second Round.

September:
23 - Elliott Ward and Daniel Fox are named in the Official Football League Championship team of the week, following their performances against Queens Park Rangers.

October:
6 - Daniel Fox is named in the Official Football League Championship team of the week, following his performances against Cardiff City and Southampton.
9 - Marcus Hall is to be awarded a testimonial match after 14 season with the Sky Blues.

November:
8 - Former Coventry City and Belgium international defender Régis Genaux passes away from a heart failure due to a pulmonary embolism
24 - Keiren Westwood and Daniel Fox are named in the Official Football League Championship team of the week, following their performances against Sheffield Wednesday.
30 - Coventry City draw Kidderminster Harriers at home in the FA Cup Third Round.

December:
3 - Livingston captain James McPake signs a pre-contract agreement with the Sky Blues.
15 - Coventry City unveil limited edition 125th anniversary kit which will go on sale on the last day of the season.

January:
4 - Coventry City draw Torquay United away in the FA Cup Fourth Round.
12 - Defender Ben Turner signs new two-year contract, keeping him at the club until 2011.
14 - Coventry City take defender Quido Lanzaat on trial, with the view of making him a permanent signing.
20 - Daniel Fox's freekick against Swansea City is voted Sky Blues' 2008 Goal Of The Year.
25 - Coventry City draw Sunderland or Blackburn Rovers (dependent on reply) away in the FA Cup Fifth Round.
26 - Coventry City take Indian international forward Sunil Chhetri on trial, with the view of making him a permanent signing.

February:
2 - Michael Doyle is named in the Official Football League Championship team of the week, following his performances against Cardiff City and Derby County.
4 - Coventry City will face Blackburn Rovers away in the FA Cup Fifth Round, following Blackburn Rovers reply win over Sunderland.
15 - Coventry City will face Chelsea at home in the FA Cup Quarter Final if they can over come Blackburn Rovers.
23 - Scott Dann is named in the Official Football League Championship team of the week, following his performance against Birmingham City.

March:
5 - Chris Coleman is named the Football League Championship Manager of the Month for February.
8 - New attendance record of 31,407 is set at the Ricoh Arena as Coventry City host Chelsea in the FA Cup Quarter Finals.
12 - Jordan Henderson is called up to the England Under-19 squad for the first time - for their friendly against Czech Republic Under-19.
18 - Chris Coleman is charged with improper conduct and/or bringing the game into disrepute for criticising referee Steve Bennett's performance against Chelsea.

April:
6 - Ben Turner is named in the Official Football League Championship team of the week, following his performance against Reading.
15 - Keiren Westwood wins South Wales Supporters' Club's Player of The Season Award for 2008/2009.
27 - Keiren Westwood & Daniel Fox are named in the 2009 PFA Championship Team Of The Year.
30 - Goalkeeper Danny Ireland signs new two-year contract, keeping him at the club until 2011.

May:
4 - Aron Gunnarsson wins Community Player of The Season Award for 2008/2009.
4 - Ben Turner wins Young Player of The Season Award for 2008/2009.
4 - David Bell wins Goal of The Season Award for 2008/2009 for his strike against Doncaster Rovers.
4 - Clinton Morrison wins Top Scorer Award for 2008/2009.
4 - Daniel Fox wins Player' Player of The Season Award for 2008/2009.
4 - Aron Gunnarsson wins Player of The Season Award for 2008/2009.
13 - Assistant Manager Steve Kean is told he is free to move on to another club.
22 - Steve Harrison is appointed new Assistant Manager to Chris Coleman, replacing the outgoing Steve Kean
29 - Keiren Westwood & Leon Best win their first full international caps for Republic of Ireland in a friendly against Nigeria .

Squad details

Players information

Matches

Pre-season friendlies

Football League Championship

League Cup

FA Cup

Championship data

League table

Results summary

Round by round

Season statistics

Starts & Goals

|}
Notes:
Player substitutions are not included.

Goalscorers

Assists

Yellow cards

Red cards

Captains

Penalties Awarded

Suspensions served

Monthly & Weekly Awards

End of Season Awards

Overall

Transfers

Transfers in

Transfers out

Loans in

Loans out

Kit profile

|
|

References

External links
 Official Site: 2007/2008 Fixtures & Results
 BBC Sport - Club Stats
 Soccerbase - Results | Squad Stats | Transfers

Coventry City F.C. seasons
Coventry City